Andrew Bayer (born February 3, 1990) is an American track and field athlete who specializes in 1500 metres and 3000 metres steeplechase. Representing the United States at the 2019 World Athletics Championships, he qualified for the final in men's 3000 metres steeplechase.

High school 
Bayer attended Leo high school just outside of Fort Wayne, Indiana.  He set school records in the 1600m (4:12) and 3200m (9:02) before winning the 3200m at the IHSAA State meet in 2008. He also earned two varsity letters in wrestling.

College 
After high school, Bayer studied and competed for Indiana University. He ended his time at Indiana as a six time Big Ten Champion, 11 time All-American, and the 2012 NCAA 1500m Champion after out-kicking Miles Batty of BYU and Ryan Hill of NC State to win by 0.01 seconds.

Professional career 
In September of 2013 he signed a contract with Nike and started training with the Bowerman Track Club in Oregon under coach Jerry Schumacher. He also started competing in the Diamond League that same year. He finished 4th place at the US olympic trials missing the national team by one place in both 2012 and 2016. In 2016 Bayer moved to Bloomington, Indiana to be coached by his former college coach, Ron Helmer, who coached him until his retirement. Nike ended his contract at the end of 2019. He announced his retirement from the sport in the spring of 2021.

In November of 2022, via an Instragm post, Bayer announced he was coming out of retirement and would start training again with goals of the competing at the 2023 World Championships or the 2024 Olympics .

Personal Life 
Bayer goes by the name "Andy". He is married and has a son and a daughter.

Results and Personal Records 

NCAA Championship Results

Championship Results

Personal Records

References

External links 
 
 

1990 births
Living people
American male steeplechase runners
World Athletics Championships athletes for the United States

Track and field athletes from Indiana